Abronia reidi, Reid's arboreal alligator lizard, is a species of arboreal alligator lizard in the family Anguidae. The species is native to Mexico. It was described as a species new to science in 1961 by John E. Werler and Frederick A. Shannon.

Etymology
The specific name, reidi, is in honor of Jack Robert Reid (born 1933) of San Antonio, Texas, who was one of the collectors of the holotype.

Geographic range
A. reidi is endemic to the Mexican state of Veracruz.

Habitat
The natural habitat of A. reidi is forest.

Reproduction
A. reidi is viviparous.

References

Further reading
Werler JE, Shannon FA (1961). "Two New Lizards (Genera Abronia and Xenosaurus) from the Las Tuxtlas Range of Veracruz, Mexico". Trans. Kansas Acad Sci. 64 (2): 123–132. (Abronia reidi, new species, p. 123).

Abronia
Reptiles described in 1961
Taxa named by Frederick A. Shannon

Endemic reptiles of Mexico